Tim M. Berra is Academy Professor and Professor Emeritus of Evolution, Ecology and Organismal Biology at Ohio State University. He received his MS (1967) and Ph.D. in biology from Tulane University in 1969. He is a three-time recipient of Fulbright Fellowships to Australia in 1969, 1979, and 2009. He taught at the University of Papua New Guinea before joining the faculty of OSU in 1972. He has spent over 11 years doing fieldwork in Australia. He is known for his ichthyological research and  biographies of Charles Darwin, Darwin's children and naturalist William Beebe. Berra has researched and written about the Murray cod, trout cod, Australian Grayling, salamanderfish, galaxiids, Megamouth shark and the nurseryfish. In 2009 the Smithsonian Institution received his collection of 260 species of rare fishes. In 2022 the National Center for Science Education (NCSE) presented Berra the "Friend of Darwin" award.

Early life and education 
Born August 31, 1943, in St. Louis, Missouri. Berra credits his mother helping him with his career in science, by allowing him to read at the dinner table despite his father thinking it wasn't a good idea. He dedicated his book Evolution and the Myth of Creationism to his mother saying "For my mother for allowing me to read during meals". He acquired a love of fish because he kept tropical fish in his bedroom as a child, which led him to read about how to take care of them to keep them healthy. He said his, "hobby education led to a career down the road".
Berra received his BS in biology at Saint Louis University and his MS and PhD in biology at Tulane University in Louisiana. He has three Fulbright scholarships which allowed him to study abroad in Australia. He is a Professorial Fellow at Charles Darwin University in Darwin, Australia.

Career
Berra has been called “an international expert in freshwater fish, with a reputation for solving long-standing mysteries.” His notable work includes the taxonomic separation of two species of Australian cod (the trout cod from Murray cod) in the Murray River, and solving the disappearance and reappearance of the salamanderfish in Southwestern Australia, discovering that they burrow when the pools dry only to reappear later when the water returns.

In 1988, Berra contributed to the preservation of a megamouth shark, a species witnessed rarely before that, described as “one of the most important zoological finds of the decade".

Berra's 1996 research on Galaxias maculatus proved that its freshwater distribution around the Southern Hemisphere was due to dispersal through the sea of salt-tolerant juveniles. He has also worked on other Chilean galaxiids.

Berra is a University Professorial Fellow at Charles Darwin University, a Research Associate the Northern Territory Museum, and Emeritus Professor of Evolution, Ecology, and Organismal Biology at Ohio State University.

 

 1969 – Awarded a Fullbright Post-Doctoral Fellowship at the Australian National University in Canberra, Australia
 1971 – Lecturer of biology, University of Papua New Guinea
 1979 – Fulbright Senior Research Fellow at Monash University in Melbourne, Australia
 1992 – Visiting professor University of Concepción in Chile
 1996 – Visiting professor University of Otago in Dunedin, New Zealand
 1992 - 2000 - Member of the Board of Trustees of the Columbus Zoo and Aquarium
 1989 - 2022 - Served on the Board of Governors of the American Society of Ichtyologists and Herpetologists.
 1981 - 1985 - Editor-in-chief of The Ohio Journal of Science.

Charles Darwin
Fascinated as a child by the adventures of the HMS Beagle and the naturalist William Beebe, Berra has written several books on Charles Darwin, Darwin's family and in 1977, Beebe. Charles Darwin: The Concise Story of an Extraordinary Man was published in 2009, timed for the 200th anniversary of Darwin's birth in 1809. Berra became interested in the children of Darwin and his wife Emma Wedgwood. The children had often been mentioned in other books, but little had been written about their lives, Berra researched the ten children and published Darwin and His Children: His Other Legacy in 2013. Darwin and his wife were first cousins, which interested Berra on how this might have affected the family genetics. Their consanguine marriage possibly affected the children with "reduced fertility" compared with similar families of their class during that time. Seven children lived to adult-hood, only three of those had children. Darwin himself suffered from ill-health, "severe digestive problems and a skin disease that made shaving so painful that he grew his distinctive beard." Berra asked researchers in Spain who had used computer modeling to understand the genetics of the Habsburg family tree to look into the genetics of the Darwin family. The result was that there was an increased risk of low infertility and bacterial infections which at least two of Darwin's children died of.

In 2016 the Washington Post contacted Berra to weigh in on the importance of finding a letter from Darwin that had been stolen 30-years prior by an intern at the Smithsonian. Berra explained that Darwin was trained as a geologist and would have been "interested in what was going on in America" this letter would be one of only 7,000 letters written by Darwin and anything by Darwin "is of historical significance and scientific significance". Berra has pushed for the city of Darwin to fully embrace the man and legacy that they are named for. In 2014 Berra said that when he started coming to Darwin in 2001 he was "struck by the fact that there was nothing visible about him (Darwin) to the public." Today, the Beagle ship bell chimes and bust of Charles Darwin reside in Darwin's Civic Center, and the former Northern Territory University is renamed Charles Darwin University. Berra gave the keynote address on Charles Darwin in 2009 at the 200th anniversary of the birth of Charles Darwin held at the Darwin Convention Center in Darwin.

After retirement

In 1995, Berra retired from teaching full-time. In 2009 he won his third Fulbright Fellowship, and continued to publish books and scientific papers. In 2016 as a Professorial Fellow stationed at Charles Darwin University in Darwin Australia, Berra continued his work on nurseryfish. His research on the nurseryfish was to investigate the male's unique adaptation, carrying thousands of fertilized eggs on a hook "like a bunch of grapes". Berra wanted to know how the embryos attached to the hook, and if the male was the genetic father of the embryos. 

During one of the research trips in 2011 with Wedd on the Adelaide River they encountered a 5-metre crocodile locals call Agro eating the fish that Berra and Wedd had trapped in a net they were using in their research. Argo got his teeth into the net and before Berra and Wedd could attempt releasing it, Argo tore a 'humungous hole' in the net. The rest of the day Argo followed them around the river.
In 2009 the Smithsonian Institution received Berra's collection of 260 species of rare fishes. Berra and his wife Rita M. Berra endowed the first chair established at Ohio State's regional campus. Berra hopes that the chair will be filled by a scientist that will do field work and return to teach at the Mansfield campus, also Berra made the bequest to honor his wife Rita whom he says "'She has made my life easier for all these years and has provided unselfish support, freeing me to pursue my research'". The chair is called the Tim M. and Rita M. Berra Endowed Chair in Evolutionary Biology, in the Department of Evolution, Ecology and Organismal Biology.

Personal life
Berra decided to apply his professional curiosity towards one of his other passions, bourbon. He attended Bourbon Academy and Moonshine University, read many books and in 2019 authored his own, BOURBON: What the Educated Drinker Should Know. Berra states that his "scientific training and methods helped him find and organize information". 
Until 2022, Berra was spending winters as a resident of Anna Maria Island in Florida. Married to Rita M. Berra.

Awards
National Center for Science Education (NCSE) presented Berra the 2022 "Friend of Darwin" award. Executive director Ann Reid stated, "Tim Berra has helped to expose the flaws of creationism going back to the days of creation science".

Selected publications

Books

References

External links
 Charles Darwin: The Story of an Extraordinary Man (audio only) - University of Toledo - November 17, 2009
 Show us your Donga - ABC Darwin - 2016
 Spectrum News 1 - October 28, 2019 - OSU Professor Turns Bourbon Passion into New Book
 May 8, 2010 - NPR All Things Considered - Darwin A Case Study In His Own Theory: Inbreeding

American ichthyologists
American science writers
Charles Darwin biographers
Academic staff of Charles Darwin University
Critics of creationism
Living people
Ohio State University faculty
Academic staff of the University of Papua New Guinea
1943 births